Wycliffe College is an evangelical graduate school of theology at the University of Toronto. Founded in 1877 as an evangelical seminary in the Anglican tradition, Wycliffe College today attracts students from many Christian denominations from around the world. As a founding member of the Toronto School of Theology, students can avail themselves of the wide range of courses from Canada's largest ecumenical consortium. Wycliffe College trains those pursuing ministry in the church and in the world, as well as those preparing for academic careers of scholarship and teaching.

History

In response to the Liberal Catholic perspective of Trinity College, which is the Toronto diocesan seminary, the Church Association of the Diocese of Toronto, a lay evangelical group at the Cathedral Church of St. James, founded the independent Protestant Episcopal Divinity School in 1877 to provide an alternative source for evangelical and low-church theological training. Like its Oxford counterpart, Wycliffe Hall, the name Wycliffe College was inspired by John Wycliffe, a 14th-century English scholastic philosopher, theologian, biblical translator, and reformer. The name was given first to the college's building and then to the college itself. To ensure its long-term viability, Wycliffe College began considering various forms of union with the University of Toronto towards the end of the 19th century. Wycliffe College became affiliated with the University of Toronto in 1885 and federated in 1889.

Wycliffe College had a close association with the Anglican Church of the Epiphany in Parkdale. The church's founding rector, Bernard Bryan, had been one of the nine men who constituted the first class at Wycliffe in 1877. This connection continued in 1959 when the Church of the Epiphany's rector, Leslie Hunt, was appointed Principal of Wycliffe College.

George Martel Miller (architect) designed Convocation Hall, 1902. Henry Bauld Gordon (architect) designed the Dining Hall and Dormitory Wing, 1907; Principal's Residence and new Chapel, 1911.

William Faulkner billeted at Wycliffe College while a student at the School of Aeronautics in 1918.

In 1969, the Toronto School of Theology (TST) was created as an independent federation of seven schools of theology, including the divinity faculties of Wycliffe College. Within its own federation, the University of Toronto granted degrees except theology or divinity degrees. Since 1978, by virtue of a change made in its charter, the University of Toronto has granted theology degrees conjointly with Wycliffe College and other TST member institutions.

An act respecting Wycliffe College, being chapter 112 of the Statutes of Ontario, 1916, was repealed and the Wycliffe College Act, 2002 was substituted. Wycliffe College's arms were registered with the Canadian Heraldic Authority on March 15, 2007.

The Wycliffe College Chapel sanctuary features several stained glass windows, including "Our Lord", "St. Paul", "St. John", and "Timothy" by Robert McCausland Limited.

Campus

Wycliffe College is situated in the centre of the University of Toronto campus, on the corner of Hoskin Avenue and Queen's Park. Next door is Hart House (University of Toronto), which houses athletic facilities, a theatre, an art gallery, reading rooms, sitting rooms, offices, a library, music rooms, student meeting and study space. Along with classrooms and a chapel, Wycliffe houses 75 graduate residents, many of whom are studying other disciplines at the University of Toronto and its affiliates.

Students have access, moreover, to the services of the University of Toronto, including the athletic facilities, library systems, and student union clubs.

Academics

The college was accredited by the Association of Theological Schools in the United States and Canada in 1978. In the fall semester of 2017 it had 246 students. It awards the following degrees conjointly with the University of Toronto:

Master of Divinity (M.Div.)
Master of Theological Studies (MTS)
Doctor of Ministry (D.Min.)
Master of Arts in Theological Studies (MATS)
Master of Theology (Th.M.)
Doctor of Philosophy (Ph.D.)

As a founding member of the Toronto School of Theology, students are able to participate in the wide range of courses from Canada's largest ecumenical consortium.

A Certificate in Anglican Studies is available for candidates for the Anglican priesthood and vocational diaconate who hold an M.Div. from a non-Anglican seminary.

Refresh is the college's annual continuing education conference. Past speakers have included Alister McGrath, Lauren Winner, N. T. Wright, William P. Young, Graham Alan Cray, and Graham Kendrick.

Library

In addition to Wycliffe's collection of theological texts, students have access to the libraries of the member schools of the Toronto School of Theology, including Knox's Caven Library, St. Michael's Kelly Library, Trinity and Wycliffe's John W. Graham Library, and the libraries of Emmanuel College, Regis College, and St. Augustine's Seminary. Students, moreover, have access to the library system of the University of Toronto, including Robarts Library, Canada's largest library and the fourth largest academic library system in North America.

Institute of Evangelism
The Wycliffe College Institute of Evangelism provides resources, including teachers and practitioners of evangelism, print and A/V materials, and conferences and seminars in order to help nurture and grow evangelizing communities. The mission of the Institute of Evangelism is to "encourage and equip the church for the work of evangelism, empowering it to engage in this ministry confidently, joyfully and expectantly."

Notable faculty
R. K. Harrison, Professor of Old Testament Studies
Jakob Jocz, Professor of Systematic Theology of Jewish background
Richard Longenecker New Testament scholar
Oliver O'Donovan Christian ethicist
John Bainbridge Webster British Anglican systematic theologian
Stephen Andrews - Principal
Christopher Seitz - Senior research professor

Noted alumni
Maret Ninan Abraham (1879–1947), later known as Abraham Mar Thoma, 17th metropolitan bishop of the Mar Thoma Syrian Church of Malabar
Alex Cameron (born 1964), bishop of the Anglican Diocese of Pittsburgh
Edward Campion Acheson (1858–1934), bishop of the Episcopal Diocese of Connecticut and father of Dean Acheson
Ins Choi (born 1974), Korean-Canadian playwright and actor and creator of Kim's Convenience.
Eleanor Clitheroe-Bell (born 1954), business executive, CEO of Hydro One and Anglican priest 
Lewis Garnsworthy (1922–1990), bishop of the Anglican Diocese of Toronto and metropolitan of the Province of Ontario
Dyson Hague (1857–1935), Anglican priest and contributing author to The Fundamentals
Michael Haykin (born 1953), Baptist theologian and professor at the Southern Baptist Theological Seminary
Grant LeMarquand (born 1955), area bishop for the Horn of Africa in the Anglican Diocese of Egypt
Stephen Leung, suffragan bishop in the Anglican Network in Canada
Linda Nicholls (born 1954), bishop of the Anglican Diocese of Huron and 14th Primate of the Anglican Church of Canada
Reginald Stackhouse (1925–2016), Progressive-Conservative MP and Anglican priest
Brian Stiller (born 1942), global ambassador at World Evangelical Alliance and former president of Tyndale University, Evangelical Fellowship of Canada, and Youth for Christ Canada
Eliud Wabukala (born 1951), archbishop and primate of the Anglican Church of Kenya

References

Further reading
 F. D. Coggan, The Story of the English Bible Illustrated in the Memorial Windows of Wycliffe College Chapel, Toronto. Toronto: University of Toronto Press, 1942.
 Arnold Edinborough, ed. The Enduring Word: A Centennial History of Wycliffe College. University of Toronto Press, 1978.
 Dyson Hague et al. The Jubilee Volume of Wycliffe College, 1877–1927. Toronto: Wycliffe College, 1927.
 Reginald Stackhouse, The Way Forward: A History of Wycliffe College, Toronto, 1877–2002. Toronto: Wycliffe College, 2002.
 Arthur N. Thompson Foundations for the Future; are the Principles of Wycliffe College Good for a Second Century? Toronto: Wycliffe College.

External links

 
 Wycliffe College Institute of Evangelism

Anglican seminaries and theological colleges
Colleges of the University of Toronto
Educational institutions established in 1877
University of Toronto buildings
1877 establishments in Ontario